Muli (International title: In Love Again / ) is a 2007 Philippine-Malaysian television drama romance series broadcast by GMA Network and TV1. Directed by Mac Alejandre, it stars Alfred Vargas, Carrie Lee and Marian Rivera. It premiered on February 19, 2007 on GMA Network's Dramarama sa Hapon line up replacing Makita Ka Lang Muli. The series concluded on May 18, 2007 with a total of 63 episodes. It was replaced Pati Ba Pintig ng Puso in its timeslot.

Cast and characters

Lead cast
 Alfred Vargas as Lukas Estadilla
 Carrie Lee Sze Kei as Cheryl
 Marian Rivera as Racquel Estadilla

Supporting cast
 Tony Eusoff as Zul
 Victor Neri as Jaime
 Odette Khan as Aunt Ason
 Daniel Tan as Lim Soon-Huat
 Alicia Mayer as Ria
 Gabby Eigenmann as Alvin
 Renz Valerio as Joshua
 Ailyn Luna as Michelle
 Vaness del Moral as Rose

Accolades

References

External links
 

2007 Malaysian television series debuts
2007 Malaysian television series endings
2007 Philippine television series debuts
2007 Philippine television series endings
Filipino-language television shows
GMA Network drama series
Malaysian drama television series
Philippine romance television series
Radio Televisyen Malaysia original programming
Television shows filmed in Malaysia
Television shows filmed in the Philippines